Volkovskaya is a station on the Frunzensko-Primorskaya Line of the Saint Petersburg Metro. The station opened on December 20, 2008, as the terminus of the newly opened Frunzensko-Primorskaya Line between Zvenigorodskaya and Volkovskaya, which at that time had only two stations. The line was extended to Komendantsky Prospekt on March 7, 2009, by adding the branch that was attached to the Pravoberezhnaya Line in the 1990s due to delays on the Frunzensko-Primorskaya Line. On December 30, 2010, Obvodny Kanal station opened between Volkovskaya and Zvenigorodskaya. In December 2012 the southeastern extension to Bukharestskaya and Mezhdunarodnaya was opened, and Volkovskaya ceased to be the terminus.

Transport 
Buses: 54, 57, 74, 76, 91, 117, 847, 856. Trams: 25, 49.

See also 
 Volkovskaya railway station

References

Saint Petersburg Metro stations
Railway stations in Russia opened in 2008
Railway stations located underground in Russia